The 1928 Wisconsin gubernatorial election was held on November 6, 1928.

Incumbent Republican Governor Fred R. Zimmerman was defeated in the Republican primary. 

Republican nominee Walter J. Kohler Sr. defeated Democratic nominee Albert G. Schmedeman with 55.38% of the vote.

Primary elections
Primary elections were held on September 4, 1928.

Democratic primary

Candidates
Albert G. Schmedeman, mayor of Madison

Results

Republican primary

Candidates
Joseph D. Beck, U.S. Representative for Wisconsin's 7th congressional district
John E. Ferris, Independent Republican nominee for Lieutenant Governor in 1924
Walter J. Kohler, Sr., industrialist
Fred R. Zimmerman, incumbent Governor

Results

Socialist primary

Candidates
Otto R. Hauser, realtor

Withdrew
Oscar Ameringer, newspaper editor

Results

Prohibition primary

Candidates
Adolph R. Bucknam, Prohibition nominee for U.S. Senate in 1922 and for Governor in 1924
Jane H. Robinson

Results

General election

Candidates
Major party candidates
Albert G. Schmedeman, Democratic
Walter J. Kohler, Sr., Republican

Other candidates
Adolph R. Bucknam, Prohibition
Otto R. Hauser, Socialist
Joseph Ehrhardt, Socialist Labor
Alvar J. Hayes, Workers

Results

Notes

References

Bibliography
 
 

1928
Wisconsin
Gubernatorial
November 1928 events in the United States